Lucius Venuleius Apronianus Octavius Priscus was a Roman senator of the second century. He was ordinary consul as the colleague of Quintus Articuleius Paetinus in 123. Subsequent to his consulate, Priscus was proconsular governor of Asia in 138 and 139. He is known primarily through inscriptions. 

While Ronald Syme suggested that Priscus was the son of Lucius Venuleius Montanus Apronianus, suffect consul in 92, J. Schied has shown this is unlikely; nevertheless, Priscus was a member of the patrician class. Further there is "no doubt" that Priscus is the father of Lucius Venuleius Apronianus Octavius Priscus, suffect consul around 145 and ordinary consul in 168.

The Venuleii family owned the magnificent villa-estate at Massaciuccoli.

References 

2nd-century Romans
Imperial Roman consuls
Roman governors of Asia
Apronianus Octavius Priscus